Association Sportive Municipale Belfortaine Football Club is a French association football team from Belfort, Franche-Comté, currently playing in the Championnat National 2, the fourth tier in the French football league system.

History
The club was founded in 1947 as Association Sportive des Patronages Belfortains and was renamed ASM Belfort 1971 after the merger with US Belfort. The club plays its home matches at the Stade Serzian in Belfort.

Current squad

References

External links
 Official blog
 Official website

Association football clubs established in 1947
1947 establishments in France
Belfort
Sport in the Territoire de Belfort
Football clubs in Bourgogne-Franche-Comté